Anthogorgia is a genus of corals belonging to the family Acanthogorgiidae.

The species of this genus are found in Pacific and Indian Ocean.

Species:

Anthogorgia agraricus 
Anthogorgia annectens 
Anthogorgia aurea 
Anthogorgia bocki 
Anthogorgia caerulea 
Anthogorgia divaricata 
Anthogorgia glomerata 
Anthogorgia grandiflora 
Anthogorgia japonica 
Anthogorgia ochracea 
Anthogorgia racemosa 
Anthogorgia verrilli 
Anthogorgia verrilli

References

Octocorallia genera
Acanthogorgiidae